Newcastle is an unincorporated community in Newcastle Township, Coshocton County, Ohio, United States.

History
Newcastle was laid out in 1808. A post office called New Castle was established in 1833, and remained in operation until 1929.

References

Populated places in Coshocton County, Ohio